General elections were held in Paraguay on 10 May 1998. Incumbent Juan Carlos Wasmosy could not run again, as the constitution limits the president to a single five-year term with no possibility of re-election.

The presidential elections were won by Raúl Cubas Grau of the Colorado Party, who received 55.3% of the vote. In the Congressional elections, the Colorado Party won 45 of the 80 seats in the Chamber of Deputies and 24 of the 45 seats in the Senate, defeating the Democratic Alliance formed by the Authentic Radical Liberal Party and the National Encounter Party. Voter turnout was 80.5%.

To date, this is the only time since the restoration of democracy in Paraguay that a presidential candidate has been elected with a majority.

Results

President

Senate

Chamber of Deputies

References

Paraguay
1998 in Paraguay
Elections in Paraguay
Presidential elections in Paraguay
May 1998 events in South America